The National Unity Party (NUP) is a political party in the Philippines. The party was formed in 2010 by former members of Lakas-Kampi CMD who broke away after internal discontent within the party. From 2016 to 2022, the party was part of the PDP–Laban-led coalition in the House of Representatives, the Coalition for Change.

The party was accredited by the Commission of Elections as a national party in a resolution dated October 5, 2011.

On September 26, 2012, the party held its first national convention where they announced support for Team PNoy for the 2013 elections, however most NUP members ultimately supported the United Nationalist Alliance, especially Garcia.

Ideology and positions 
According to the party's constitution, NUP's principles include the following: belief in God; sovereignty of the state, national interest and democracy; social justice and responsibility; and environmental awareness.

 Chairman: Ronaldo V. Puno
 Vice-Chairman for Local Government: Alberto Garcia
 Vice-Chairman for Political Affairs: Vacant
 Vice-Chairman for External Affairs: Romeo Acop
 Vice-Chairman for Internal Affairs: Rep. Roberto Puno, Deputy Speaker House of Representative, 1st District of Antipolo
 National President: Rep. Elpidio Barzaga Jr., Lone District of Dasmariñas
 Secretary-General:  Rep. Narciso Bravo Jr., 1st District Representative of Masbate
 Treasurer: Rep. Luis A. Ferrer IV, 6th District of Cavite
 Deputy Secretary-General for Political Affairs: Reginald Velasco
 Deputy Secretary-General for Public Affairs: Brian S. Yamsuan
 Deputy Secretary-General for Administration: Rex L. De La Cruz

List of party chairmen 
 Pablo P. Garcia (2011–2013)
 Ronaldo Puno (2013–present)

Elected members

District Representatives

 Benny Abante
 Resurreccion Acop
 Alex Advincula
 Antonio Albano
 Samantha Alfonso
 Franz Alvarez
 Julienne Baronda
 Elpidio Barzaga Jr.
 Alfel Bascug
 Narciso Bravo Jr.
 Fernando Cabredo
 Wilfredo Caminero
 Anthony Peter Crisologo
 Luisa Cuaresma
 Leo Cueva
 Paolo Duterte
 Faustino Dy V
 Sandra Eriguel
 Dan Fernandez
 Juliette Ferrer
 Diego "Nonoy" C. Ty

 Luis Ferrer IV
 Vince Frasco
 Pablo John Garcia
 Neptali Gonzales II
 Rashidin Matba
 Yul Servo Nieto
 Ramon Nolasco Jr.
 Jose Ong, Jr.
 Gavini Pancho
 Adolf Edward Plaza
 Roberto Puno
 Strike Revilla
 Florida Robes
 Princess Rihan Sakaluran
 Janice Salimbangon
 Edgar Mary Sarmiento
 Lorna Silverio
 Horacio Suansing Jr.
 Jose Antonio Sy-Alvarado
 Joy Myra Tambunting
 Sheena Tan
 Abraham Tolentino
 Juliette Uy
 Rolando Valeriano
 Vicente Veloso
 Micaela Violago
 Boying Remulla

Partylist allies
 Enrico Pineda (1-Pacman)
 Mikee Romero (1-Pacman)
 Eric Go Yap (ACT-CIS)
 Niña Taduran (ACT-CIS)

Governors
 Ma. Jocelyn V. Bernos – Abra
 Rhodora J. Cadiao – Antique
 Roel R. Degamo – Negros Oriental
 Albert Raymond S. Garcia – Bataan
 Rashidin H. Matba – Tawi Tawi
 Santiago B. Cane Jr. – Agusan del Sur
 Daniel R. Fernando – Bulacan
 Arthur R. Defensor, Jr. - Iloilo
 Juanito Victor C. Remulla Jr. - Cavite

Mayors
 Leopoldo "Pol" N. Bataoil – Lingayen, Pangasinan
 Reynaldo San Pedro – San Jose del Monte City, Bulacan
 Jose Enrique Garcia III – Balanga, Bataan
 Gila Garcia – Dinalupihan, Bataan
 Bartolome Ramos – Santa Maria, Bulacan
 Elpidio Barzaga Jr. – Dasmariñas, Cavite
 Canuto "Tito" Oreta (†) – Malabon
 Dr. Feliciano Legaspi, M.D. – Norzagaray, Bulacan
 Luis "Jon-Jon" Ferrer IV – General Trias
 Maloney Samaco – Maasin City, Southern Leyte
 Eduardo J. Villanueva Jr. Bocaue, Bulacan
 Arnel Mendoza – Bustos, Bulacan
 Lem Faustino - Calumpit, Bulacan
 Marita Flores - Doña Remedios Trinidad, Bulacan
 Ambrosio Cruz - Guiguinto, Bulacan
 Enrico Roque – Pandi, Bulacan
 Anastacia Vistan – Plaridel, Bulacan
 Alicia Rama-Ty – Plaridel, Misamis Occidental
 Joselito "Litoy" Alega – San Francisco, Quezon
 Jose G. Ardales – Victoria, Northern Samar
 Kirk A. Asis – Bayugan, Agusan del Sur
 Engr. Ronnie Vicente Lagnada – Butuan
 Stephen Alayon- Sigma, Capiz
 Monico Puentevella – Bacolod, Negros Occidental
 John Geesnell "Baba" Lim Yap – Tagbilaran, Bohol
 Roberto "Bobby" Sanchez – Lubang, Occidental Mindoro
 Jerry Treñas –  Iloilo City
 Carla Galvez-Tan - San Ildefonso, Bulacan
 Jennie Rosalie T. Uy-Mendez - Villanueva, Misamis Oriental
 Haneya Theresa Yap-Chiong - Baliangao, Misamis Occidental
 Abraham “Bambol” N. Tolentino - Tagaytay City
 Rolando "Klarex" A. Uy - Cagayan de Oro

Electoral performance

Presidential and vice presidential elections

Legislative elections

References

External links

Social conservative parties
Conservative parties in the Philippines
Christian democratic parties in Asia
Political parties established in 2011
2011 establishments in the Philippines